Georgia's 60th House district covers southeast Atlanta, Hapeville, and parts of Clayton and DeKalb counties of the U.S. state of Georgia.

Elected representatives

References

60
Clayton County, Georgia
DeKalb County, Georgia